Tzadik ("righteous [one]", also zadik, ṣaddîq or sadiq; pl. tzadikim   ṣadiqim) is a title in Judaism given to people considered righteous, such as biblical figures and later spiritual masters. The root of the word ṣadiq, is ṣ-d-q ( tsedek), which means "justice" or "righteousness". When applied to a righteous woman, the term is inflected as tzadika/tzaddikot.

Tzadik is also the root of the word tzedakah ('charity', literally 'righteousness'). The term tzadik "righteous", and its associated meanings, developed in rabbinic thought from its Talmudic contrast with hasid ("pious" honorific), to its exploration in ethical literature, and its esoteric spiritualisation in Kabbalah.

Since the late 17th century, in Hasidic Judaism, the institution of the mystical tzadik as a divine channel assumed central importance, combining popularization of (hands-on) Jewish mysticism with social movement for the first time. Adapting former Kabbalistic theosophical terminology, Hasidic philosophy internalised mystical experience, emphasising devekut attachment to its Rebbe leadership, who embody and channel the Divine flow of blessing to the world.

Etymology

Ṣedeq in Canaanite religion may have been an epithet of a god of the Jebusites. The Hebrew word appears in the biblical names Melchizedek, Adonizedek, and Zadok, the high priest of David.

Nature of the Tzadik

Definitions
In classic Jewish thought, there are various definitions of a tzadik. According to Maimonides (based on Tractate Yevamot of the Babylonian Talmud 49b-50a): "One whose merit surpasses his iniquity is a tzadik".

According to Shneur Zalman of Liadi's Tanya, a work of Hasidic Judaism, the true title of tzadik denotes a spiritual description of the soul. Its true meaning can only be applied to one who has completely sublimated their natural "animal" or "vital" soul inclinations into holiness, so that they experience only love and awe of God, without material temptations. Hence, a tzadik serves as a vehicle (מרכבה merkavah) to God and has no ego or self-consciousness. Note that a person cannot attain such a level, rather it is granted from on High (or born with, etc.). This select level elevates the "Intermediate" person (beinoni) into one who never sins in thought, speech or action. Unlike the Tzadik, they only experience divine devekut (communion) during devoted moments of worship or study, while in mundane life they can be tempted by natural inclinations, but always choose to stay connected to holiness. In the Tanya the difference between the former Talmudic-Maimonidean and latter Kabbalistic-Hasidic conceptions is raised. Since the "Torah has 70 facets" of interpretation, perhaps both conceptions are metaphysically true:

Tzadikim Nistarim

The Talmud says that at least 36 Tzadikim Nistarim (anonymous tzadikim) are living among us in all times; they are anonymous, and it is for their sake alone that the world is not destroyed.<ref>The Kohanim represent the tzaddikim who "eat to satiate their souls" (Book of Proverbs 13: 25). Not only can they elevate the material world to the spiritual, but they draw spirituality into the material world as well (Likutey Halakhot III)</ref> The Talmud and the Kabbalah offer various ideas about the nature and role of these 36 tzadikim. In Jewish folklore they are called lamedvovniks, from the gematria numerical value for 36. In Hasidic Judaism, with its social institution of the Tzadik in the central role of the community, the 36 may not necessarily be unknown, therefore. However, a Hasidic aphorism describes a known Rebbe Tzadik as being among the 36, as their true greatness could be concealed beyond the perception of their devoted followers.

Tzaddik of the Generation

Hasidim adhere to the belief that there is a person born each generation with the potential to become Messiah, if the Jewish people warrant his coming. This candidate is known as the Tzadik Ha-Dor, meaning Tzaddik of the Generation.

Miracle workers

While tzadik status, according to its above definitions, is not necessarily related to the ability to perform or call upon miracles, the term tzadik is often used loosely by the Talmud to indicate those who have achieved especially outstanding piety and holiness. In this context, the tzadik's prayers are considered especially potent, as the Talmud states: "A tzadik decrees and the Holy One (blessed be He) fulfills." This is line with the Talmudic dictum: Rabban Gamliel the son of Rabbi Judah haNasi used to say: "Make His Will your own will, that He make your will as His Will."

In some contexts, people refer specifically to the pious miracle worker as a tzadik. In Hasidism, the doctrine of "Practical Tzadikism", developed by Elimelech of Lizhensk, involved the Tzadik performing miracles to channel the Ayin-Yesh Divine blessing. In its most extreme version, Hasidic "wonder-workers", predominant in 19th century Poland, emphasised this conception, sometimes criticised by other Hasidic leaders as superficial. To Menachem Mendel of Kotzk, and his reaction against Popular Tzadikism, the greatest miracle was to examine oneself without self-delusion.

Historical sources
Based on the teachings of Isaac Luria, the Baal Shem Tov and the Chaim ibn Attar, Shneur Zalman of Liadi taught in the name of the Zohar that "He who breathed life into man, breathed from Himself." Therefore, one's soul comes from the essence of God.

According to Kabbalah, a tzadik, because they have completely nullified themselves and their desires to what God wants, their Godly soul (which like every Godly soul is part of God) is revealed within them more than other people who have not completely nullified themselves to God.
This concept is based upon many Jewish sources. Here are some:

 The Zohar: "Et pnei Ha'adon YHWH - do Rashbi" (Lit., "The Countenance of the Lord YHWH - this is [a reference to] Rabbi Shimon Bar Yochai.")
 The Jerusalem Talmud: "Was not Eliahu the ruler of the prophets? But it teaches that all the time he was standing before his teacher Aḥiyya from Shilo it was as if he stood before the Divine Presence." This is explained in the Yesod HaAvodah of Alexander Süsskind of Grodno in the name of David ben Solomon ibn Abi Zimra: "This was because Aḥiyya had his mind and thoughts connected and cleaved to the greatness of the holy one, and Elijah when he stood before his teacher connected his thoughts with the thoughts of his teacher with the love from his heart, and therefore it was as if he stood in front of the Shekhinah."
 Bahya ben Asher comments on the verse "And Moses took the tent and pitched it for himself outside the camp, distancing [it] from the camp, and he called it the tent of meeting, and it would be that anyone seeking the Lord would go out to the tent of meeting, which was outside the camp." saying that "From here we see that Moses was called with the Tetragrammaton, and we also find that Jacob is called with El...And we also find by the name of a Tzadik that he is called with the Tetragrammaton... And we also find that by King Messiah that he is called with the Tetragrammaton as it is stated. and this is his name that he shall be called, The Lord is our righteousness...And the reason by all of them is because one who cleaves to something, is called by the thing which he is cleaving to."
 Joel Sirkis "The purpose of The Blessed One was always that one should be involved in Torah in order to bond our souls in the essence and spirituality and holiness of the source of the giver of the Torah... And if one is involved in Torah study with this intention, one becomes a Merkavah and Heichal for the Shekhinah may he be blessed, so that the Shekhinah is literally within them, because they are a Heichal to God and within them literally the Shekhinah establishes its dwelling place."
 Chaim of Volozhin "If someone sanctifies himself properly through the performance of all the Mitzvot...Then he himself is the Beit HaMikdash itself...Because this is the truth regarding Tzadikim through the deeds which are desirable by the blessed one they are the Mikdash mamash"
 Moshe Chaim Luzzatto: "The holy one who cleaves constantly to God and his soul fires up with true intellectual understanding with great love of his creator and fear...Behold a person like this, he himself, is considered to be like the Tabernacle Beit HaMikdash and the Mizbeiach...And also it is said regarding Tzadikim they are the Markavah, because the Shekhinah dwells in them just like it dwelled in the Beit HaMikdash."
 Eliyahu Eliezer Dessler: "And this thing is so much certain to one that thinks in depth about it, until it is impossible to understand how someone can argue on it, and so was already mentioned in the words of many of the great scholars like the Ramchal and others, that the image of Tzadikim is Hashem may He be blessed, Himself, and they are the same."
 In 1951, the seventh Rebbe of Chabad, Menachem Mendel Schneerson, made a similar statement regarding the practice by Hasidic Jews to have a rabbi act as an intermediary with God on their behalf. He explained, "The Rebbe is completely connected with his Hasidim, not like two separate things that connect; rather, they become completely one. And the Rebbe is not an intermediary which separates, but one that connects. Therefore by a Hassid, he with the Rebbe with God are all one ... Hence, it is not possible to ask any questions about [how it is possible to turn to the Rebbe as] an intermediary [for the purpose of asking him to pray to Hashem on one’s behalf], since this is Atzmus uMehus [God's Essence] itself as it put itself in a body. This is similar to the statement of the Zohar, 'Whose is the face of the Master [God]? This is the Rashbi.'."

Terminology in Kabbalah

Identification with Yesod

"..For all that is in Heaven and on Earth.."
"-For all כל (Yesod) joins the Heaven and the Earth"
"The Tzadik is the foundation (Yesod) of the World"
In the system of 10 Sephirot Divine emanations in Kabbalah, each of the 7 emotional expressions is related to an archetypal figure in the Hebrew Bible. The first emanated realm to emerge from God's potential Will in Creation is Atziluth, the World of "Emanation". As it is still nullified to Divinity, so not yet considered a self-aware existence, it is the realm where the 10 Sephirot attributes of God are revealed in their essence. In lower spiritual worlds the sephirot also shine, but only in successively lower degrees, concealed through successive contractions and veilings of the Divine vitality. Seven biblical tzadikim, righteous figures are considered as embodiments of the emotional sephirot of Atzilut: Abraham-Kindness, Isaac-Restraint, Jacob-Mercy, Moses-Endurance, Aaron-Glory, Joseph-Foundation, David-Kingship. While all seven figures are considered supreme Tzadikim, in particular contexts, either Joseph as Yesod, and Moses as inclusive soul of the community, are identified especially as archetypes for the Tzadik in general.

In the sephirot, Chesed-Abraham, Gevurah-Isaac and Tiferet-Jacob are higher spiritual powers than Yesod-Joseph, which channels the higher powers to their fulfilment in Malchut action. However, traditionally in Judaism, Joseph is referred to with the quality of "Tzadik-Righteous". While the Patriarchs lived righteously as shepherds, Joseph remained holy in Egypt, surrounded by impurity, tested by Potiphar's wife, captive in prison, and then active as viceroy to Pharaoh. As the Heavenly sephirah of Yesod-"Foundation" channels spirituality to our physical realm, so in Kabbalah and the further development in Hasidic thought, its function also parallels the human role of the Tzadik in this world:

 In the Divine, Yesod is the 9th Sefirah, in the middle balanced column, connecting all the higher sefirot, centred on Tiferet-"Beautiful" emotional harmony, to the last sefirah Malchut- realisation in "Kingship". In the flow of Divine Creative lifeforce, this represents the connecting channel between Heaven and Earth, between the "Holy One Blessed Be He" (Tiferet Divine transcendent male manifestation of God), and the "Shekhinah" (Malkuth indwelling Divine immanent female presence of God). The 16th century Safed Kabbalists introduced the prayer "For the sake of the union" of these principles before Jewish observances.
 In the soul, Yesod is contact, connection and communication with outer reality of malchut, similar to the way the foundation of a building connects it with the earth.
 In the bodily form of man and woman, Yesod corresponds to the organ of procreation, analogously where the Tiferet body descends towards action, expressed in the procreative power to create life. This relates to the Circumcision "Covenant of Abraham", the Jewish "Sign of the Covenant" with God. As the Torah describes two levels of Jewish covenant, physical "covenant of circumcision" and spiritual "circumcision of the heart", so women are considered born already physically circumcised. Joseph's resistance to Potiphar's wife represents his perfection of the "Sign of the Covenant". Yesod is the foundation of a person's future generations, the power of generating infinity in the finite.
 Yesod is identified with the righteous tzadik, "the tzadik is the foundation of the world". As Jewish mysticism describes different levels of Tzadik, Kabbalah sees this verse as particularly referring to the one perfect tzadik of the generation. In the tzadik, God's infinite-transcendent light becomes manifest in this finite-immanent world. The tzadik procreates spiritually through revealing Divinity in new Torah interpretations, and through awakening return to God in his generation.
 Yesod connects beginning to end in God who encompasses all. In the Bible, Abraham began the Yesod covenant of circumcision, though his sefirah is Chesed love-kindness, the first emotional expression. Love creates the unity of spiritual covenant. For Abraham this descended into action, to become expressed in the physical covenant of circumcision. Yesod expresses this descent, uniting spiritual and physical. "Foundation" is the beginning of a building and the conclusion of planning. Yesod is the power to bring action to conclusion, to reveal that the beginning and end are united in God, "the end is wedged in the beginning, and the beginning in the end".
 Each Sefirah contains an inner dimension, as a soul motivating its outer Kabbalistic emanation function. Hasidic thought explores the Divine motivation within, by psychologising Kabbalah through man's experience. The inner motivation of Yesod is Emet-truth, each person's desire for their actions to reflect their true soul intention, fulfilling in action God's essential intention for Creation. The Tzadik experiences the wish for Divine purpose consummately.

Intellect in the supernal soul of the community
"..To love the Lord your God, to listen to His voice, and to cleave to Him.."
"Cleaving to a Torah scholar is as cleaving to the Divine Shechinah"
The leaders of Israel over the masses stem from the intellect of Adam's soul
"In every generation there is a leader like Moses"
 The soul of the Tzadik is an inclusive, general soul of the community. In Kabbalah, gematria (numerical value) has significance, because Creation is formed through Divine "speech" as in Genesis 1. The gematria of Yesod (יסוד) is 80, 8 times 10, forming reduced value of 18 (חי Life), as a tzadik is called truly alive spiritually. 80 is the value of Klal (כלל), the "community", the extension of Kol (כל), the term in Kabbalah for the sephirah of Yesod. The "Tzadik of the generation" is a "general soul" (neshama klalit) of the generation, in which each individual soul is included. Hasidic thought focuses on this parallel, and its application for each person. Through the personal connection of each soul to the tzadik, their Yechidah soul-essence becomes revealed, through the revelation of the Yechidah of the Tzadik.

Breslov Hasidut

Rebbe Nachman of Breslov explained how only a true leader can awaken the most genuine Jewish faith: this leader is the Tzadik.

 Variants as first names 

 Hebrew: Tzadik or Zadik
 Amharic, Tigrinya: Tsadik (ጻድቅ) or Tsadkan (ጻድቃን)
 Arabic: Sadiq, Sadeq (صَادِق)
 Persian: Sadegh or Sadeq

Tzadik in Hasidism

See also
 Gadol
 Gaon

References

Sources
 Frumer, Assaf. Kol Hanikra Bishmi (Hebrew)
 Lessons In Tanya
 Pevzner, Avraham. Al HaTzadikim'' (Hebrew). Kfar Chabad. 1991

External links
 Kuntres HaHishtatchus The classic Maamar explaining the significance of visiting the grave of a Tzaddik. (In English) chabad.org
 Maaneh Lashon An English rendition of the prayers to be said at the graveside of the righteous.
 Torah sources concerning Tzaddikim
 Connotations of the Kabbalistic sephirah Yesod-Foundation from inner.org
 Connotations of the inner dimension of Yesod: Emet-Truth from inner.org
 "The Soul of Life: The Complete Neffesh Ha-chayyim" (2012), Amazon, 

Religious honorifics
Hasidic thought
Jewish theology
Jewish culture
Kabbalah
Orthodox rabbinic roles and titles
Hebrew words and phrases in Jewish law
Talmud concepts and terminology